Mark Timothy Alban MBBS, DRCOG, MRCGP (born 19 April 1966) is an English medical doctor and former first-class cricketer.

Born at Kendal, Westmorland, Alban studied at Sedbergh School and Jesus College, Cambridge, playing first-class cricket during his studies for the university cricket club. Alban made his first-class debut for the university against Nottinghamshire at Fenner's in 1989, with him playing two further first-class matches in that season against Sussex at Hove and Oxford University at Lord's. He scored a total of 134 runs at an average of 33.50, with a high score of 86, which came against Oxford University.

Alban is now a general practitioner in Bristol.

References

External links
Mark Alban at ESPNcricinfo
Mark Alban at CricketArchive

1966 births
Living people
People from Kendal
Alumni of the University of Cambridge
English cricketers
Free Foresters cricketers
Cambridge University cricketers
20th-century English medical doctors
21st-century English medical doctors